The 2014 West Oxfordshire District Council election took place on 22 May 2014 to elect members of West Oxfordshire District Council in Oxfordshire, England. One third of the council was up for election and the Conservative Party stayed in overall control of the council.

After the election, the composition of the council was:
Conservative 40
Labour 5
Liberal Democrats 3
Independent 1

Background
After the previous election in 2012 the Conservatives controlled the council with 41 councillors, while both Labour and the Liberal Democrats had four seats. However, in May 2013 two Conservative councillors, Steve Hayward of Ducklington ward and David Snow of Witney North, resigned from the party to become Independents. They were joined the following month by Annie Roy-Barker of Chipping Norton ward who also left the Conservatives to become an independent. With seats in Ducklington, and Stonesfield and Tackley, vacant the council composition before the 2014 election was therefore 37 Conservatives, four Labour, four Liberal Democrats and two independents.

16 seats were scheduled to be contested in 2014, but the vacancy in Stonesfield and Tackley meant 17 seats were elected. A total of 66 candidates stood for election, 17 Conservatives, 15 Labour, 11 Green, 11 UK Independence Party, nine Liberal Democrats and three independents. 10 sitting councillors sought re-election, with councillors Annie Roy-Barker, Arthur Goffe, Hilary Hibbert-Biles, Verena Hunt and Larry Poole standing down at the election.

The election was held on 22 May 2014 at the same time as the 2014 European Parliament elections.

Election result
The Conservatives gained two seats to have 40 councillors and a 31-seat majority on the council. They gained a seat in Eynsham and Cassington from the Liberal Democrats and regained Ducklington, which had previously been held by independent, former Conservative, councillor Steve Hayward.

Labour moved to become the second largest group on the council with five councillors after gaining one seat, while the Liberal Democrats dropped to three seats and only one independent councillor remained on the council. The UK Independence Party failed to win any seats, but came second in seven of the wards they contested, coming closest in Witney South where James Robertshaw was 152 votes behind Conservative David Harvey. All ten sitting councillors who stood were re-elected and overall turnout at the election was 39.03%.

Ward results

References

2014 English local elections
2014
2010s in Oxfordshire